Bardovo is a rural locality (a village) in Gorkinskoye Rural Settlement, Kirzhachsky District, Vladimir Oblast, Russia. The population was 3 as of 2010. There are 10 streets.

Geography 
Bardovo is located 20 km north of Kirzhach (the district's administrative centre) by road. Slobodka is the nearest rural locality.

References 

Rural localities in Kirzhachsky District